West Ham won the FA Cup Final for the first time, coming from behind to beat Preston North End 3–2.  The goals were scored by John Sissons, Geoff Hurst and Ronnie Boyce.

1963-64
English football clubs 1963–64 season
1963 sports events in London
1964 sports events in London